Mopidevi is a village in Krishna district of the Indian state of Andhra Pradesh. It is the mandal headquarters of Mopidevi mandal in Machilipatnam revenue division. It is one of the villages in the mandal to be a part of Andhra Pradesh Capital Region. The village is known for its famous Lord Subrahmanyeswar Swamy Temple. The village is situated 80Km from Vijayawada and 30Km from Machilipatnam.

Transportation 

NH216, a spur road of NH16 passes through this village. This road connects ongole and Kathipudi village in East godavari district .

APSRTC runs buses from Avanigadda, Gudivada, Kuchipudi, Movva, challapalli, Machilipatnam, Repalle, Ghantasala  by connecting mopidevi village.

Nearest Railway Stations 
Machilipatnam railway station (MTM), Gudivada Junction railway station (GDV), Repalle railway station (RAL), Vijayawada Junction railway station (BZ) are the nearest railway stations to this village.

Economy
Paddy is the main cultivated crop in the village.

See also 
Villages in Mopidevi mandal
Mopidevi Temple

References 

Villages in Krishna district
Mandal headquarters in Krishna district